The Mohamed Mahmoud Khalil Museum is a museum in Giza, Egypt. It is located in a palace built in the early 20th century.

History
The museum was opened on 23 July 1962, and dedicated to the memory of Mohammed Mahmoud Khalil Pasha and his wife Emiline Lock.

In 1971 it was sectioned by the government of Egypt; President Anwar El-Sadat used it for executive offices. The palace was returned to museum use in 1993.

Collection

Among the great artists works endowed by Mohammed Mahmoud Khalil and his wife are those of Paul Gauguin, Claude Monet, Auguste Renoir, Auguste Rodin and Vincent van Gogh. The Museum houses a fine collection of Impressionist paintings, mainly collected before 1928, which alone rivals most European National Collections.

Art thefts 
A van Gogh painting known both as Poppy Flowers, also known as Vase and Flowers and Vase with Viscaria was cut from its frame and stolen from the museum in August 2010. Several members of Egypt's Ministry of Culture, including Deputy Minister of Culture Mohsen Shaalan, faced criminal charges as a result of the theft, with prosecutors arguing that they created or perpetuated the conditions that allowed the crime to occur. Previously, the painting had been stolen from the museum's temporary location in 1978, and recovered 10 years later in Kuwait. Nine paintings of the 19th-century Egyptian ruler Ibrahim Pasha were stolen in 2009, and were found 10 days later dumped outside.

See also
List of palaces in Egypt

References

External links 

Mohamed Mahmoud Khalil Museum Egypt State Information Service

Museums in Cairo
Art museums and galleries in Egypt
Biographical museums in Egypt
Buildings and structures in Giza
Palaces in Egypt
Art museums established in 1962
1962 establishments in Egypt
Former private collections
Arab art scene